The Old Bell is a pub in Henley-on-Thames, Oxfordshire. It was built in 1325 and is the oldest building in Henley. It is a Grade II* listed building.

History
The building has a timber frame, with a crown post which dendrochronology has dated to 1325. It was built probably as a wing of a large town house.

In the 1760s it was converted into a pub called The Duke of Cumberland.

It is currently controlled by Brakspear Brewery.

See also
 Old Bell, a list of other pubs with this name

References

14th-century architecture in the United Kingdom
Grade II* listed pubs in Oxfordshire
Henley-on-Thames
Timber framed pubs in England